Dennis Gilbert (born October 30, 1996) is an American professional ice hockey defenseman who is currently playing with the Calgary Flames of the National Hockey League (NHL). He was selected by the Chicago Blackhawks, 90th overall, in the 2015 NHL Entry Draft.

Early life
Gilbert was born on October 30, 1996, to parents Dennis Sr. and Kim Gilbert. Growing up, he refused to play hockey year round in order to play lacrosse and football.

Playing career
Gilbert played junior hockey with the Buffalo Jr. Sabres in the Ontario Junior Hockey League and the Chicago Steel in the United States Hockey League (USHL) before he was selected in the third round, 90th overall, in the 2015 NHL Entry Draft by the Chicago Blackhawks.

Gilbert played collegiate hockey for the Notre Dame Fighting Irish at the University of Notre Dame, originally of Hockey East. In his sophomore season with the Fighting Irish in 2016–17, Gilbert helped guide Notre Dame to the Frozen Four and was announced as the Hockey East's Best Defensive Defenseman and a Hockey East Third Team All-Star.

Gilbert concluded his collegiate career following his junior season with the Fighting Irish in the 2017–18 season, turning professional by signing a three-year, entry-level contract with the Chicago Blackhawks on April 14, 2018.

Entering the final year of his entry-level deal on October 10, 2020, Gilbert was traded by the Blackhawks, alongside Brandon Saad, to the Colorado Avalanche in exchange for Nikita Zadorov and Anton Lindholm.

Following two seasons in Colorado, Gilbert left as a free agent and was signed to a two-year, $1.525 million contract with the Calgary Flames on July 13, 2022.

Career statistics

Awards and honors

References

External links

1996 births
Living people
American men's ice hockey defensemen
Calgary Flames players
Calgary Wranglers players
Chicago Blackhawks draft picks
Chicago Blackhawks players
Chicago Steel players
Colorado Avalanche players
Colorado Eagles players
Notre Dame Fighting Irish men's ice hockey players
Rockford IceHogs (AHL) players
St. Joseph's Collegiate Institute alumni